Kim Sung-joon (Hanja: 金聖埈; born 8 April 1988) is a South Korean football player who plays for Ulsan Hyundai as a midfielder.

Career statistics

Club

Honours

Club

Ulsan Hyundai
AFC Champions League: 2020

International

South Korea
 EAFF East Asian Cup: 2017

External links 
 
 
 

1988 births
Living people
South Korean footballers
Association football midfielders
South Korea under-17 international footballers
South Korea under-20 international footballers
South Korea international footballers
South Korean expatriate footballers
Daejeon Hana Citizen FC players
Seongnam FC players
Cerezo Osaka players
Gimcheon Sangmu FC players
FC Seoul players
Ulsan Hyundai FC players
K League 1 players
J1 League players
Expatriate footballers in Japan
South Korean expatriate sportspeople in Japan
People from Jinju
Sportspeople from South Gyeongsang Province